SCET may refer to:
Sarvajanik College of Engineering and Technology, Surat, India
Scottish Centre for Enabling Technologies
Scottish Council for Educational Technology, see Learning and Teaching Scotland
Shadan College of Engineering and Technology, Hyderabad, Andhra Pradesh, India
Soft-collinear effective theory
Spacecraft Event Time